The Patron Saint of Liars may refer to:

The Patron Saint of Liars (novel), a 1992 novel by Ann Patchett
The Patron Saint of Liars (film), its 1998 television film adaptation